Samuel Rexford (October 14, 1776 Claverack, then in Albany Co., now in Columbia County, New York - February 24, 1857 Lock Haven, Clinton County, Pennsylvania) was an American politician from New York.

Life
He was in the lumber business. He was Supervisor of the Town of Sidney in 1826 and 1827.

He was a member of the New York State Assembly (Delaware Co.) in 1823.

He was a member of the New York State Senate (2nd D.) from 1829 to 1832, sitting in the 52nd, 53rd, 54th and 55th New York State Legislatures.

Sources
The New York Civil List compiled by Franklin Benjamin Hough (pages 127f, 144, 199 and 299; Weed, Parsons and Co., 1858)
History of Sidney, on-line version of The History of Delaware County by W. W. Munsell
Death notice in Annual Obituary Notes of Eminent Persons, for 1857 by Nathan Crosby (Boston, 1858; pg. 284f)
Rexford genealogy

External links
His house (demolished 1937) in Images of America: Sidney by Erin Andrews and the Sidney Historical Association (2010;  ; pg. 28)

1776 births
1857 deaths
People from Claverack, New York
People from Sidney, New York
New York (state) state senators
New York (state) Jacksonians
19th-century American politicians
Town supervisors in New York (state)
Members of the New York State Assembly